Juan José de Amézaga Landaroso (January 28, 1881 – August 21, 1956) was a Uruguayan political figure.

Background
Amézaga was a prominent member of the Colorado Party, which ruled the country for long periods.  He was a lawyer by profession, and taught that subject at university level for many years. His political base was in Durazno, which he represented in the Chamber of Deputies between 1907 and 1915 and later served as Industry Minister. Amézaga was involved in much legislation of a reformist nature, with one study noting that "As a deputy, he intervened, either as an author, as an informant member or in the discussions, in all the laws that were sanctioned from 1908 to 1914. He was the author, among others, of the following projects: old-age pensions, work accidents, free salary of the married woman, and the reorganization of the National Public Assistance, in collaboration, this last project with an extra-parliamentary Commission."

President of Uruguay

Main features
He was President of Uruguay from 1943 to 1947. His rule is seen as significantly the first wholly constitutional presidency since the coup d'état carried out by Gabriel Terra in 1933.

Amézaga's vice president was Alberto Guani, who had already distinguished himself as a veteran diplomat.  The veteran Socialist leader Emilio Frugoni was sent to Moscow by President Amézaga, as Uruguayan Ambassador.

Social reforms

Amézaga's presidency was notable for the passage of a wide range of reform laws. During his first year as president laws were passed establishing a social assistance fund to provide food for the unemployed and for pre-school and schoolchildren throughout the country, amending the law regulating home industries, organizing departmental labor distribution commissions, providing for aid to the unemployed via investment in extraordinary public works, regulating working conditions in the lumber industry, fixing minimum wages and working conditions in the construction industry, lowering rents for workers’ homes, and regulating working hours. Education budgets were also raised for normal and secondary schools, and measures adopted to help farmers affected by an unprecedented drought. This included creating arbitration and conciliation boards to solve the problem of farm rents, regulating the marketing of wheat, and providing for the acquisition of seed oats. In addition, there were also "a great number of price-fixing and other regulatory measures, adopted to control the cost of living and the supply and distribution of articles of prime necessity." There was also reform in the Ministry of Public Health, "all directed toward improvement in administration, more exacting standards for specialized positions, and an increase in health activities, especially in  the interior of the country."

Act No. 10,489 of 6 June 1944 "modified the standards for hours and rest periods for commercial establishments of a certain type which can interrupt their activities without inconvenience to the public." The Act also fixes "opening and closing hours for such establishments and provides that they may be open to the public from five minutes after their opening until ten minutes before their closing time ; the staff may be required to work continuously, subject to the observance of specified rest periods." Additionally, the Act "forbids the working of more than eight hours on five days of the week and four hours on the sixth. The protection afforded by the Act is extended to the staff of such workshops as commercial establishments may possess on their own premises for the manufacture or finishing of goods for direct retail sale to the public. Such staff must be regarded as commercial employees and not as workers in industry." Act No. 10,421 of 16 April 1943 regulates the hours of work for banks and similar institutions, dividing the year into two periods, "one running from 1 April to 15 December, and the other from 16 December to 31 March, and entrusts to a tripartite board the fixing of the hours during which these establishments, whether public or private, may be open to the public in winter and in summer respectively." Under the Act the ordinary working day "is limited to six and a quarter hours daily, with a fifteen-minute break granted between the fourth and fifth hours. The staff may be required to work up to forty-five additional hours in the quarter, outside this ordinary working day, provided that no employee is requested to do so more than twenty-one times per quarter, for not less than two hours at a time. This last provision is intended to prevent the additional hours from being used in a, manner contrary to the spirit of the law, for example, by spreading them at the rate of forty-five minutes per day, which would extend the working day to seven hours."

The right to an annual holiday of twelve days with pay was established by Act No. 10,684 of 17 December 1945 established the right to 12 days of paid annual holiday "for all persons in the employment of private  individuals or undertakings who have completed twelve months, twenty-four fortnights or fifty-two weeks of work, whether or not the employment has been continuous, and whether it has been with one or several employers ; the right to the holiday depends solely on the time worked." Earlier measures, the first of which was adopted in 1933, had provided for an annual holiday in various branches of activity, fixed at twelve working days after one year's continuous service; but they dealt separately with salaried employees paid by the month and wage earners paid by the day. The Act also provided that "on 1 January, 1 May and 25 August (the national holiday) of each year all wage earners shall be paid as though they had worked on these days ; if they were in fact employed on any of these days, they mast receive double pay. The annual holiday thus in practice amounts to fifteen days." Act No. 10,471 of 3 March 1944 extends to workers "employed in the exploitation of forests, mountains and peateries the benefits of the laws on hours of work, weekly rest, wage councils and family allowances, and moreover establishes compulsory insurance against industrial accidents and occupational diseases, giving the Government and the State Insurance Bank the power to prohibit work, by force, if need be, when this obligation has not been met." Act No. 10,449 of 12 November 1943 "defines the minimum wage, sets up a system of wage councils for its fixation and provides for family allowances. It protects wage earners and salaried employees in industry, commerce, private offices and the offices of public services not run by the State. The first part of the Act (sections 1-4) defines what is meant by the minimum wage, determines how it is to be calculated for piece work, specifies that payment shall be made in currency and prohibits the truck system. It makes employers responsible for the actions of agents and subcontractors in their service. The National Institute of Labour and Belated Services is empowered to represent the workers in making direct or indirect claims for the payment of wages due." This part of the Act "fixes the various penalties that may be inflicted upon those who infringe it and the procedure to be followed for the recovery of fines. The second part of the Act (sections 5-20 and 28-30) contained notes "for the setting up of wage councils to determine minimum wage rates for workers protected by the Act, whose activities are grouped for purposes of simplified administration." The third part of the Act "introduced a compulsory-system of equalisation funds for the payment of family allowances to all wage earners and salaried employees in respect of each legitimate or illegitimate, legally recognised or legally registered child. Allowances are paid in respect of children up to fourteen years of age, or up to sixteen if they attend a secondary school or preparatory studies or are undergoing apprenticeship at special centres. The allowance is paid to the worker, who is responsible for its administration. Together with his wages, and those of his wife if she also works, it may not exceed 200 pesos. When one of the children is the breadwinner, he receives the allowance, his brothers and sisters being treated as his children for this purpose; a similar rule applies with regard to an employed person, of either sex, who is the sole support, permanently and in a manner duly proved, of one or more orphans or deserted children."

Act No. 10,489 of 6 June 1944 and its counterpart No. 10,542 of 20 October 1944, "provides that all wage earners and salaried employees in commerce, private services, public services run by private individuals, and industry who do not work at piece rates, or for daily or hourly wages, shall have the right, when dismissed, to a compensation equivalent to their total monthly remuneration (including wages, percentages, commissions on sales, gratuities) in respect of each year of service or fraction of a year, up to three months' pay if they are pensionable, and six months' pay if not. This compensation cannot be combined with that provided by Article 158 of the Commercial Code, but does not affect that due under section 26 of Act 'No. 9196." In October 1946 an Agricultural Workers’ Code was enacted "to provide general coverage to rural workers on such matters as wages, housing, weekly rest and annual holidays, unfair dismissal, etc." Act No. 10,570 of 15 December 1944 regulated "the system of dismissal compensation for workers on piece rates or on daily or hourly wages and permanently employed in industry, who had been excepted from the general law. The compensation amounts to twenty-five days' pay for each year during which the worker has worked 240 days, subject to a maximum of three or six months' pay, depending on whether or not he is pensionable. Workers who have worked in the same establishment for less than 240 days but more than 100 days are entitled to two days' compensation for every twenty-five days of work. Here also, misconduct deprives the worker of his right to compensation." Workers in the meat packing industry who are members of its Unemployment Fund were subject to a special régime under Act No. 10,713 of 15 March 1946.  If the Board of the Fund "considers the dismissal unfair, the worker may choose between compensation and the benefits paid by the Fund. Compensation is composed of two parts: one part is paid to the worker and is equal to two working days' pay for every twenty-five days or every month of permanent employment at the disposal of the Fund, up to a total of 75 or 150 working days' pay, according as he is entitled to pension or not ; the other consists of the aggregate of the specified indemnities which the undertaking must pay to the Fund as fixed by the Board."

To combat unemployment in the meat packing industry, the largest industry in Uruguay, Act No. 10,562 of  21 December 1944 established an Unemployment Fund and provided for the organisation of employment exchanges for the members of the Fund. The system of benefits established by the Act "guarantees a minimum of 100 hours of work per month per worker ; if a worker is employed for less than this minimum, the Fund pays him benefit in respect of the hours not worked, in accordance with a special schedule. Workers protected by this Act cannot refuse without just cause to give their services when the establishment so requires, whether in their ordinary occupation or in any other activity." Under Act No. 10,681 of 10 December 1945, a similar scheme to that for the meat packing industry "was introduced for workers in wool, leather, etc., depots and warehouses, whose activity extends over only a few months of the year, since their work depends on the harvest and is seasonal in character."

In a speech he made in 1946, Amezaga listed various laws that had been introduced, amended and passed. Amongst others, these included laws concerning employment offices for maritime workers, increased pay for pieceworkers, and reduced rents on rural land where there was hoof and mouth disease. In addition, various measures were adopted concerning public works and other subjects including a public health program, lowcost housing in Montevideo and Artigas, creation of a School of Library Science, establishment of a School of Liberal Arts and of an oceanographic and fishing service, the imposition of a tax on all profits over 12% a year, and improvement of sanitation. According to a presidential decree approved on January the 28th 1944, laborers on public works projects “are henceforth to have the benefit of adequate and sanitary housing facilities whenever the construction projects on which they are working are located more than a mile and a quarter from the nearest town or city limits,” and on the 20th of December 1944 the Uruguyan Congress approved a law authorizing the issuance of bonds to finance a 5-year public works program, with proceeds used for projects like reforestation and soil erosion control. A Permanent National Fund was set up to assist in the fight against tuberculosis, which was exclusively aimed at providing social assistance pensions to the families of tubercular patients. In addition, an Honory Commission was established “to function within the Ministry of Public Health, charged with studying, planning, and advising the Government on measures to combat the disease, organizing and directing a permanent census of tuberculosis sufferers in the country, preparing and disseminating campaign propaganda, and administering the Fund.” In August 1944 10,000,000 pesos were authorized by the government for city and rural school building throughout Uruguay. In 1945, the government took various steps to alleviate the increased cost of living at the time, such as contributing money towards lower consumer prices for articles of prime necessity such as meat, potatoes, bran, oats, corn, and wheat, while money was also contributed towards supporting popular dining rooms in the capital and provinces, and for winter social assistance and social security.

1947
The year 1947 opened with Amézaga, younger by several years than his successor, preparing to step down as President in favour of his elected successor, Tomás Berreta, who was already aged in his 70s. Berreta's Presidency was to last barely 5 months, since he was to die in office.

See also
Politics of Uruguay
List of presidents of Uruguay

References

1881 births
1956 deaths
People from Montevideo
Presidents of Uruguay
Candidates for President of Uruguay
Amezaga, Juan Jose de
Uruguayan people of Basque descent
Colorado Party (Uruguay) politicians
Uruguay in World War II
Burials at Cementerio del Buceo, Montevideo